Faraz Javed is a television journalist, presenter, and producer who has worked in the United States and United Arab Emirates for broadcasters including MTV Networks, part of Viacom Media Networks and Dubai One, Dubai Media Incorporated.

Career
Javed is one of the new broadcast journalists to join ABC News in Detroit at WXYZ-TV. He has covered a variety of stories, from breaking news, to political agendas and issues that impact people across Michigan. Javed is also part of the networks's weekend morning team. 

Javed was previously seen as one of the news anchors and senior reporters at Emirates News, Dubai One TV. The program broadcasts from a Dubai Media City studio. However, Javed also reported breaking news from various locations across the United Arab Emirates, covering major events like the Emirates Mars Mission and Abraham Accords among others. In addition to his duties at Dubai One TV, Javed also had his reality series on CrossFit on dubai On demand, one of Dubai's leading YouTube channels.

He has produced a number of television series including That's Entertainment, Hayati Amali, Studio One, Peeta Planet (Consulting Producer) and Mouth Piece. He has also worked on various commercials, infotainment videos, short films, music videos, and feature films such as Mission: Impossible – Ghost Protocol and Star Trek Beyond.

Javed is also associated with various radio stations in the United States and United Arab Emirates. He has hosted 'Kickstart' on PZR 91.1 FM broadcasting in Michigan  and co-hosted with Ray Addison on Dubai Eye 103.8.,

Alongside producing, Javed is an actor, appearing in a number of plays, short films and commercials.

A sports enthusiast, Javed has been trained in Brazilian jiu-jitsu, boxing, swimming, horse riding and Crossfit.

List of Interviews

Hollywood Film and TV Interviews

Ben Stiller 
Eva Longoria
Susan Sarandon
Simon Baker
Priyanka Chopra
Alexandra Burke
Jay Leno
Kelly Hu
Sarah, Duchess of York
Madeleine Stowe
Gina Torres
Sarah Rafferty
Jodi Benson
Patrick Renna
James Jude Courtney
Che Pope

Bollywood Film and TV Interviews

Shah Rukh Khan
Salman Khan
Ranveer Singh
Priyanka Chopra
Vaani Kapoor
Shilpa Shetty

Athlete Interviews

Rio Ferdinand
Mo Farah

Political Figure Interviews

John Rakolta

References

1984 births
Living people
American television producers
American directors
University at Buffalo alumni